Ardozyga sporodeta is a species of moth in the family Gelechiidae. It was described by Turner in 1919. It is found in Australia, where it has been recorded from Queensland.

The forewings are ochreous-whitish with numerous dots and a few scattered dark-fuscous scales. There are subcostal and subdorsal dots near the base and a subdorsal dot at one-sixth. The stigmata are larger and rather suffused, the plical beyond the first discal, the second discal before two-thirds. There is a series of dots on the apical half of the costa and near the termen. The hindwings are whitish with pale-grey suffusion towards the apex.

References

Ardozyga
Moths described in 1919
Moths of Australia